The year 2013 is the 2nd year in the history of the Glory, an international kickboxing event. 2013 starts with 2013 Road to Glory USA 95 kg Tournament, and ends with Glory 13: Tokyo. The events were broadcasts through television agreements with Spike TV and other regional channels around the world.

List of events

Road to Glory USA 95 kg Tournament

Road to Glory USA 95 kg Tournament was a kickboxing event held on February 2, 2013 at the Hard Rock Hotel and Casino in Tulsa, Oklahoma, US.

Background

Results

Road to Glory USA 85 kg Tournament

Road to Glory USA 85 kg Tournament was a kickboxing event held on February 9, 2013 at the Hollywood Park Casino in Los Angeles, California, US.

Background

Results

Road to Glory Japan 65 kg Tournament

Road to Glory Japan 65 kg Tournament was a kickboxing event held on March 10, 2013 at the Differ Ariake Arena in Tokyo, Japan.

Background

Results

Road to Glory USA 77 kg Tournament

Road to Glory USA 77 kg Tournament was a kickboxing event held on March 22, 2013 at the Capitale in New York City, New York, US.

Background

Results

Glory 5: London

Glory 5: London was a kickboxing event held on March 23, 2013 at the ExCeL Arena in London, England.

Background
This event featured a super fight between Tyrone Spong and Remy Bonjasky as headliner; this event also featured non-tournament super fight series.

Results

Glory 6: Istanbul

Glory 6: Istanbul was a kickboxing event held on April 6, 2013 at the Ülker Arena in Istanbul, Turkey.

Background
This event featured a super fight between Gökhan Saki and Daniel Ghiță as headliner, this event also featured non-tournament super fight series.

Results

Glory 7: Milan

Glory 7: Milan was a kickboxing event held on April 20, 2013 at the Mediolanum Forum in Milan, Italy. This event featured non-tournament super fight series.

Background
This event featured a super fight between Giorgio Petrosyan and Hafid El Boustati as headliner. In co-main event, Murthel Groenhart had to battle with fellow superstar  Robin van Roosmalen, this event also featured non-tournament super fight series.

Results

Glory 8: Tokyo

Glory 8: Tokyo was a kickboxing event held on May 3, 2013 at the Ariake Coliseum in Tokyo, Japan. This event featured a Glory 65kg Slam Tournament.

Results

Glory 65kg Slam Tournament bracket

Glory 9: New York

Glory 9: New York was a kickboxing event held on June 22, 2013 at the Hammerstein Ballroom in New York City, New York. This event featured a Glory 95kg Slam Tournament.

Results
 Final : Tyrone Spong def. Danyo Ilunga via KO at 0:16 of Round 1
 Super Fight : Rico Verhoeven def. Errol Zimmerman via majority decision
 Super Fight : Wayne Barrett def. Mike Lemaire via KO at 1:12 of Round 2
 Semi-final : Tyrone Spong def. Filip Verlinden via unanimous decision
 Semi-final : Danyo Ilunga def. Dustin Jacoby via unanimous decision
 Super Fight : Daniel Ghiță def. Brice Guidon via KO at 0:49 of Round 1
 Super Fight : Joseph Valtellini def. Francois Ambang via TKO at 1:04 of Round 3
 Quarter-final : Tyrone Spong def. Michael Duut via KO at 0:31 of Round 1
 Quarter-final : Filip Verlinden def. Steve McKinnon via majority decision
 Quarter-final : Dustin Jacoby def. Brian Collette via split decision
 Quarter-final : Danyo Ilunga def. Mourad Bouzidi via unanimous decision
 Super Fight : Anderson Silva def. Daniel Sam via unanimous decision
 Reserve Fight : Randy Blake def. Koichi Watanabe via unanimous decision
 Reserve Fight : Artem Vakhitov def. Luis Tavares via KO at 1:06 of Round 1

Glory 95kg Slam Tournament bracket

Glory 10: Los Angeles

Glory 10: Los Angeles was a kickboxing event held on September 28, 2013 at the Citizens Business Bank Arena in Ontario, California.

Background
The highlight of the event featured a Glory Middleweight World Championship Tournament. Two tournament matches were held, with a third match as reserve. The winners of the two semi-final bouts, proceeded to the finals for the championship main-event. The event also featured eight other non-tournament bouts.

Results

2013 Glory Middleweight World Championship Tournament bracket

1 Extra round decision.

Glory 11: Chicago

Glory 11: Chicago was a kickboxing event held on October 12, 2013 at the Sears Centre at Hoffman Estates, Illinois.

Background
The highlight of the event featured a Glory Heavyweight World Championship Tournament. Two tournament matches were held, with a third match as reserve. The winners of the two semi-final bouts, proceeded to the finals for the championship main-event. The event also featured other non-tournament bouts.

It was Glory's first event broadcast on Spike, had average of 381,000 and peak of 782,000 viewers.

Results

2013 Glory Heavyweight World Championship Tournament bracket

Glory 12: New York

Glory 12: New York was a kickboxing event held on November 23, 2013 at The Theater at Madison Square Garden at New York City, New York.

Background
The highlight of the event featured a Glory Lightweight World Championship Tournament. Two tournament matches were held, with a third match as reserve. The winners of the two semi-final bouts, proceeded to the finals for the championship main-event. The event also featured other non-tournament bouts.

It had average of 476,000 and peak of 665,000 viewers on Spike TV.

Results

2013 Glory Lightweight World Championship Tournament bracket

Glory 13: Tokyo

Glory 13: Tokyo was a kickboxing event held on December 21, 2013 at the Ariake Coliseum in Tokyo, Japan.

Background
The highlight of the event was a Glory Welterweight World Championship Tournament. Two tournament matches were held, with a third match as reserve. The winners of the two semi-final bouts proceeded to the finals for the championship main-event. The event also featured other non-tournament bouts, including the retirement match of the legendary Peter Aerts, against Rico Verhoeven, and Daniel Ghiță vs. Errol Zimmerman II.

Glory 13 had average of 659,000 and peak of 905,000 viewers on Spike TV.

Results

2013 Glory Welterweight World Championship Tournament bracket

References

Glory (kickboxing) events
2013 in kickboxing
Kickboxing in the United Kingdom